Paul Stephen is an American voice actor. He is best known for voicing Kou Uraki in Mobile Suit Gundam 0083: Stardust Memory. He also did the voice of Sion Barzahd, the protagonist in The Bouncer.

Filmography

Animation/Anime Roles
Fist of the North Star as Sela (ep. 16)
 Giant Robo: The Animation (Original Dub) as Daisaku Kusama (eps. 6–7)
 Hyper Doll as Additional Voices
 Mobile Suit Gundam 0083: Stardust Memory as Kou Uraki
 Mobile Suit Gundam: The 08th MS Team as Additional Voices
 Sentou Yousei Yukikaze as Ito (eps. 1–2)
 Serial Experiments Lain as Additional Voices
 Trigun as Juilus (ep. 11)
 Wolf's Rain as Huss (ep. 9)

Video Game Roles
 The Bouncer as Sion Barzahd
 Suikoden IV as Snowe Vingerhut

External links
 
 Paul Stephen at CrystalAcids

Living people
Year of birth missing (living people)
American male voice actors